John Amory Lowell (November 11, 1798 – October 31, 1881) was an American businessman and philanthropist from Boston.  He became the sole trustee of the Lowell Institute when his first cousin, John Lowell, Jr. (1799–1836), the Institute's endower, died.  (Lowell 1899, pp 117–118)

Family 
John Amory, the second child of John Lowell, Jr (1769–1840) and Rebecca Amory (1771–1842), was among the first generation of Lowells to be born in Boston, and the fifth generation to be born in America.  His father maintained a well-established law firm in the city, and three years after John Amory's birth, retired for reasons of his failing health. After retiring in 1801, the elder Lowell spent much of his time and wealth patronizing the burgeoning horticultural society in Boston, so much so that he became known to his friends and family as "The Norfolk Farmer."  John Amory Lowell's paternal grandfather, also named John Lowell (1743–1802) but referred to as "The Old Judge," was a Federal Judge appointed by President George Washington and is considered to be the founding father of the Boston Lowells.  (Greenslet 1946) 

Like his father and grandfathers before him, Lowell was the fourth member in his family line to graduate from Harvard College in 1815, at the age of 17.

After spending an extended time traveling through Europe and then establishing himself as a successful merchant in Boston, Lowell married his first wife, Susan Cabot Lowell (1801–1827), a daughter of his uncle, Francis Cabot Lowell.  Together, they had two children, Susan Cabot and John.  Lowell's wife died during childbirth in 1827.  Their son, John, was appointed to the U.S. District Court in 1865 by President Abraham Lincoln, and in 1878, appointed to the U.S. Circuit Court by President Rutherford B. Hayes.  John Amory's grandson, James Arnold Lowell, also went on to become a Federal Judge.  Lowell's wife, Susan Cabot, who was a great-granddaughter of Edward and Dorthy (Quincy) Jackson, connected their children and their descendants to those of the Holmeses of Boston, a family that includes poet Dr. Oliver Wendell Holmes, Sr., and U.S. Supreme Court justice and Civil War hero, Oliver Wendell Holmes, Jr.

With his second wife, Elizabeth Cabot Putnam (1807–1881), Amory fathered a son and three daughters.  Augustus, Elizabeth Rebecca, Ellen Bancroft, and Sara Putnam. Augustus Lowell became a very successful businessman and eventually succeeded Lowell as the second trustee of the Lowell Institute.  John Amory's grandchildren, through Elizabeth Cabot, included author and astronomer Percival Lowell, Harvard President Abbott Lawrence Lowell, and poet Amy Lowell.

Career 
In 1835 and 1838, John Amory became the first treasurer for both Merrimack Manufacturing Company and Boott Cotton Mill, textile mills in Lowell, Massachusetts.  And in 1857, he became director of The Winnipiseogee Lake Cotton and Woolen Manufacturing Company.  This were all positions that his son, Augustus, succeeded to within the same companies. (Bay State Monthly 1884) 

Lowell was a Fellow of Harvard College (1837–1877), a Fellow of the American Academy of Arts and Sciences, and a member of the Linnean Society of London.  Later, in 1851, Harvard honored John Amory with an LLD.

Lowell Institute 

The trust—or Lowell Institute, as it came to be known—had an unusual mode of governance: a single trustee who was empowered to appoint his successor and who was, in the language of John Lowell, Jr.'s will, to "always choose in preference to all others some male descendant of my grandfather, John Lowell, provided there be one who is competent to hold the office of trustee, and of the name of Lowell." (Everett 1840)  Despite this odd restriction (or perhaps because of it), the Institute proved to be an extraordinarily innovative philanthropic force.

Under John Amory, its first trustee, the Institute flourished. Lowell was both a man of extraordinary financial acumen and a man of high intellect.  The list of Lowell Lecturers during his tenure was a veritable pantheon of the most internationally celebrated figures in science, literature, politics, economics, philosophy, and theology, including Britain's most celebrated geologist, Sir Charles Lyell, Swiss naturalist Louis Agassiz, and novelists Charles Dickens and William Makepeace Thackeray.

The lectures were so immensely popular that crowds crushed the windows of the Old Corner Bookstore where the tickets were distributed and certain series had to be repeated by popular demand.  John Amory tirelessly led the Lowell Institute for more than 40 years before naming his son, Augustus, as his replacement.

See also 
 Lowell family
 First Families of Boston
 Lowell Institute
 Lowell, Massachusetts
 Kirk Boott

References 

1798 births
1881 deaths
Harvard College alumni
Businesspeople from Boston
American people of English descent
19th-century American philanthropists
19th-century American businesspeople